Jean-Léonard Touadi (born 25 January 1959 in Brazzaville, Republic of the Congo) is a Congolese-Italian journalist, author and politician. Touadi was raised in France and immigrated to Italy in 1979. There, he rose to prominence as a television journalist and as Rome's deputy mayor in charge of security.

In the 2008 general election he was elected to the Italian Parliament with Italy of Values (IdV), becoming Italy's second black Member of Parliament (MP) and the first MP from sub-Saharan Africa. On 11 July 2008, few months after his election, he left the IdV and joined the Democratic Party (PD).

He is married to Cristina Bacillieri and they have two daughters: Sophie-Claire (2005) and Sandrine (2007).

Notes

References

 Profile at Italian Chamber of Deputies
http://www.italymag.co.uk/italy/politics/italy-gets-third-black-mp
http://www.adnkronos.com/AKI/English/Politics/?id=1.0.2074789726

1959 births
Living people
People from Brazzaville
Italian people of Republic of the Congo descent
Democratic Party (Italy) politicians
21st-century Italian politicians
Italy of Values politicians